Bungay Castle is a gothic novel by Elizabeth Bonhôte, first published in 1797. It is set loosely in the thirteenth century around the First Barons' War, and follows the fortunes of the fictional De Morney family at the real Bungay Castle in Suffolk. Bonhôte's husband purchased the ruins of this castle in 1791. The novel was published by William Lane's Minerva Press. The core themes of the novel are conservative and pro-monarchic.

Summary 
Roseline and Edwin De Morney live with their father, Sir Philip De Morney, at Bungay Castle, which is near the convent of Saint Mary's. While a student at the convent, Roseline befriends a young novice there, Madeline, and brings her home to Bungay Castle. Madeline and Edwin fall in love. While Sir Philip is away, Roseline, Edwin, and Madeline explore the castle, which they suspect to be haunted, and find a gentleman, Walter, locked in a hidden apartment with his servant Albert. Albert is a ventriloquist, and the source of all the haunted sound effects. Walter and Roseline fall in love. However, Sir Philip has arranged for Roseline to marry Baron Fitzosborne, a wealthy older widower. The Baron is eager to marry in part so he can leave Bungay Castle, where he believes he is haunted by his late wife. Roseline dislikes the Baron  but agrees to obey her father. However, the wedding is interrupted by Walter, who follows a secret tunnel between the castle and Saint Mary's to appear with a sword. Baron Fitzosborne realises that Walter is in fact his son, believed dead due to a scheme by his late wife and her brother. The Baron agrees that Roseline can marry his son instead of him. First, however, he introduces Walter to society in London. Walter accidentally becomes entangled with the daughter of a brothel-keeper, who attempts to trick him into marriage. He flees London for Bungay Castle to reunite with Roseline, and at last plans go forward for Walter and Roseline's wedding. Meanwhile, Madeline and Edwin have eloped. They disappeared shortly after Roseline's attempted wedding with the Baron, escaping the convent through the same tunnel used by Walter. They are rescued from poverty by Walter, and both Edwin and Madeline eventually reconcile with their fathers. Sir Philip's other two children, Bertha and Edeliza, make their own suitable marriages, as does the Baron, and the novel ends with optimism for everyone's futures.

Background

The real Bungay Castle was built and developed in the twelfth and thirteenth centuries before falling into disrepair after the death of Roger Bigod, 5th Earl of Norfolk. Bonhôte, who was born in Bungay, often explored its ruins as a child in the mid-eighteenth century. In 1791, her husband bought the site of the castle. Around 1800, he sold it to Henry Charles Howard, 13th Duke of Norfolk, to whom the novel Bungay Castle is dedicated.

Major themes 

Bungay Castle is considered a politically conservative novel, as reflected in several aspects of its plot and setting. Bonhote emphasizes in her preface that she does not want to write about politics, but the novel itself frequently compares parental governance to political governance. By praising the good household management of a father who is the ruler of his family, she expresses approval for the general idea of good governance by a virtuous king. One parallel between the De Morney family and the monarchy is a painting described in the novel, of the three daughters playing with a dog, which resembles a painting of George III's daughters.

Bonhote's conservative and pro-monarchical views are also reflected in her use of Bungay Castle as her setting. When Bonhôte began her novel, castles were a common setting, verging on the stereotypical. The preface to Bungay Castle describes her dissatisfaction with novels that are overly fanciful and set in foreign or imaginary castles. Bonhôte was deeply familiar with Bungay Castle in Suffolk, and used this local setting to introduce more realism to her novel. She also chose her historical time period to recapture the castle's days of greatest glory. During her lifetime, the ruins of the castle had been partly converted into cottages for the rural poor, which she saw as a sad waste of a building which had once been highly desired by barons and kings. Her emphasis on the restoration of Bungay Castle to its medieval glories therefore reflects a general emphasis on conservative and pro-monarchist politics in the novel.

Like many eighteenth-century Gothic novels, Bungay Castle depicts convents as predatory institutions which imprison women against their will. This depiction of convents is in keeping with the novel's overall anti-Catholic sentiments.

Publication and reception 
The book's imminent publication was advertised in December 1796, and its appearance was promoted in May 1797. The date of 1796 of the title page is therefore considered inaccurate, and the 1797 date on the book's dedication as more accurate.

In October 1797, a review in The Critical Review was lukewarm. The reviewer praised Bonhôte's prose and described the hero, Walter, as "a being somewhat different from his predecessors in the dungeons," but found the plot too repetitive and the dialogue "very tame and insipid."

Editions
Curt Herr (editor). Bungay Castle: A Novel, Zittaw Press, 2006.

References

External links
Bungay Castle at Internet Archive (scanned books original editions)
 
Plot synopsis at the Corvey Project

1797 novels
English Gothic novels
Novels set in Suffolk